Sundar Das is an Indian film director in Malayalam movies. He directed more than 10 Malayalam movies. His popular movies are Sallapam, Kuberan and Sammanam. Malayalam actress Manju Warrier debuted with his movie Sallapam, which was also his debut film. He took a break after Akasham in 2007 and made a comeback in 2013 with the movie Rebecca Uthup Kizhakkemala.

Filmography

References

External links

Malayalam film directors
Artists from Kozhikode
Living people
Year of birth missing (living people)
Film directors from Kerala
20th-century Indian film directors
21st-century Indian film directors